Sušje (also Draga or Deroh; , Gottscheerish: Därroch) is a remote abandoned settlement in the Municipality of Črnomelj in the White Carniola area of southeastern Slovenia. The area is part of the traditional region of Lower Carniola and is now included in the Southeast Slovenia Statistical Region. Its territory is now part of the village of Rožič Vrh.

History
Sušje was a Gottschee German village. It was abandoned and overgrown before the Second World War.

References

External links
Sušje (Draga) on Geopedia
Pre–World War II list of oeconyms and family names in Sušje

Former populated places in the Municipality of Črnomelj